
Year 261 (CCLXI) was a common year starting on Tuesday (link will display the full calendar) of the Julian calendar. At the time, it was known as the Year of the Consulship of Gallienus and Taurus (or, less frequently, year 1014 Ab urbe condita). The denomination 261 for this year has been used since the early medieval period, when the Anno Domini calendar era became the prevalent method in Europe for naming years.

Events 
 By place 
 Roman Empire 
 Emperor Gallienus crushes the Alemanni at Milan (approximate date).
 Gallienus repeals the edict of 258, which led to the persecution of the Christians. 
 Gallienus usurpers: The rebellion of Macrianus Major, Macrianus Minor, and Quietus against Gallienus comes to an end. They march from Asia to Europe but they are defeated in Thrace by Gallienus' general Aureolus, and both Macrianus Major and Macrianus Minor are killed. Quietus flees to Emesa, where he is killed by Odaenathus of Palmyra.
 Roman–Persian Wars: Balista, Roman usurper, collects ships from Cilician ports and defeats a Persian raiding force near Pompeiopolis.

 Asia 
 Michu of Silla ascends to the Korean throne of Silla, becoming the first ruler of the Long Kim line.

Births 
 Lu Ji (or Shiheng), Chinese general and politician (d. 303)

Deaths 
 June 9 – Wang Ji (or Boyu), Chinese general (b. 190)
 Lucius Mussius Aemilianus, Roman usurper
 Macrianus Major, Roman general and usurper
 Macrianus Minor, Roman consul and usurper
 Quietus, Roman consul and usurper
 Valens Thessalonicus, Roman usurper
 Yang Xi (or Wenran), Chinese politician

References